John Sharian (born John Shahnazarian) is an English actor of Armenian descent. He appeared in the film The Machinist (2004).

Education
John Sharian attended the Taft School in Watertown, Connecticut and later the Kenyon College in Gambier, Ohio, which he left in 1984.

Career
Sharian graduated from the Bristol Old Vic Theatre School in 1991 and began television acting shortly thereafter, appearing in the British sci-fi comedy series Red Dwarf in 1992.

Sharian's film career began in 1994 with his role as one of the leads in Death Machine. He also appeared in The Fifth Element (1997), Saving Private Ryan (1998) and The Machinist (2004).

Sharian is a member of Armenian Dramatic Arts Alliance.

Selected filmography

1992: Red Dwarf (TV Series, Episode: "Back to Reality") - New Lister
1994: Death Machine - Sam Raimi
1997: The Fifth Element - Fhloston Captain
1998: Lost in Space - Noah Freeman
1998: Saving Private Ryan - Corporal
1999: Driver - (Video Game) (voice)
1999: New World Disorder - Rice
1999: Do Not Disturb - Bodyguard
2000: Fortress 2: Re-Entry - Hickey
2000: 24 Hours in London - Tony
2000: Jason and the Argonauts (TV Mini-Series) - Pollux
2000: Chicken Run - Circus Man (voice, uncredited)
2001: Gothic (Video Game) - Milten (English version, voice)
2002: Vietcong (Video Game) - (voice)
2003: Dracula II: Ascension (Direct-to-DVD-Production) - Officer Hodge
2003: Gothic II (Video Game) - (voice)
2003: Calendar Girls - Danny
2003: Love Actually - Wisconsin Taxi Driver
2004: The Machinist - Ivan
2004: Vietcong: Fist Alpha (Video Game) - (voice)
2004: Romasanta - Antonio
2004: Sex Traffic (TV Mini-Series) - Barry Edwards
2005: Spooks (TV Series) - Michael Gorman
2006: Land of the Blind - Guy in Strip Club
2007: WΔZ - Jack Corelli
2007-2010: CSI: Miami (TV Series, 2 episodes) - Joe LeBrock
2008: New Amsterdam (TV Series) - Jack Shaw
2009: Law & Order (TV Series) - George Darvey
2009: Staten Island - Tarquinio
2010: Law & Order: Criminal Intent (TV Series) - Jan Van Dekker
2010: Red Dead Redemption (Video Game) - The Local Population (voice)
2010: Boy Wonder - Joe Mancini
2010: Rocksteady - Big Red
2011: 3 Weeks to Daytona - Gomes
2012: Disconnect - Ross Lynd
2015: True Story - Lincoln County Lobby Sheriff
2016: Horace and Pete (TV Series) - Jerold
2017: Patti Cake$ - Lou
2018: Accommodations - Vital Vekselberg
2019: The Kitchen - Duffy

Radio

References

External links

20th-century American male actors
21st-century American male actors
American male video game actors
Year of birth missing (living people)
Living people
Male actors from Connecticut
American male film actors
American male television actors
American male voice actors
Kenyon College alumni
Alumni of Bristol Old Vic Theatre School
People from Watertown, Connecticut